The depiction of night in paintings is common in art in Asia. Paintings that feature the night scene as the theme are mostly portraits and landscapes. Some artworks which involve religious or fantasy topics use the quality of dim night light to create mysterious atmospheres. They tend to illustrate the illuminating effect of the light reflection on the subjects under either moonlight or artificial light sources.

Historical overview

Early oriental artists created works that focused on design and spiritual interpretation of their subjects rather than realistic, three-dimensional representations. For centuries, eastern night paintings were spiritually and emotionally evocative works with unshaded, two-dimensional imagery. Like the western world, the moon, candles, and stars helped set the nocturnal scene. But there were also items, such as clothing and tree leaves, that might be used in a specific way to express nighttime from an eastern perspective.

The 16th century Mughal painter Basawan was an early artist who integrated western techniques and perspective into eastern art. When trade opened up between the far east and the west art slowly changed in both sides of the world. For instance, Japanese ukiyo-e prints influenced Parisian artists. And, Jesuit priests, like Matteo Ricci, brought artwork to China that introduced western approaches for perspective and shading. These factors broadened the way in which nighttime was portrayed everywhere.

Symbolism
Black and grey shades often symbolize gloom, fear, mystery, superstitions, evil, death, secret, sorrow. The light source in most religious paintings symbolize hope, guidance or divinity. In fantasy paintings light could symbolize magic.

By region

East Asian art

China
Traditional Chinese artists sought to capture the interrelated, vast and multifaceted aspects of nature here are on earth and in the heavens. From the article "The Great Art of China's 'Soundless Poems'", Heaven appears "before us only this bright shining mass; but in its immeasurable extent, the sun, the moon, stars and constellations are suspended in it, and all things are embraced under it." Night scenes, not otherwise distinguishable from daytime in Chinese art, include candles, light emanating from a building, the moon, or lake mists.

Symbolism plays an enduring role in the telling of a story through painting or other Chinese art. For instance, stars and the moon are important both for religious significance and as an illustration of Chinese mythology. Symbols used in art may be grouped into four overarching categories: religious imagery, divine and mortal beings, symbols from nature and inanimate objects. Some examples of symbols include bats which means both good wishes and good luck. The moon, aside from religious and mythical connotations, can also mean a month. The particular way an image is depicted has meaning - like a round eyed-cat means it's a night scene.

Artists use rice paper, silk or wood panels to paint night scenes. Silk has illuminating effect, while wood panels create a dark background.

Battle

Folklore and literature

Literature

Dream of the Red Chamber and Strange Stories from a Chinese Studio were inspiration for night time paintings.

Almost 500 legendary tales written by Pu Songling are compiled in Strange Stories from a Chinese Studio or Liaozhai Zhiyi. The tales, inspired by oral storytelling, include strong mythical characters like ghosts, immortals, beasts and foxes. They also offer commentary about people, particularly the privileged and court officials, whose human frailties may result in unfair, unjust and other unfavorable treatment to others. He wrote with vivid imagery about the music of heaven, the inability of the light produced by a fire-fly to illuminate the demons of the night, red rings in the sky that shear the heads off of men, and the six conditions of existence: men, sinners, angels, demons, beasts and devils. Nighttime is a symbol for people's inability to understand the world around them. And the supernatural beings are meant to be a mirror to examine the nature of man. From a preface by T'ang Meng Lai to the book, Lai states that the book should prompt the readers to reflect upon the following: "We marvel at devils and foxes: we do not marvel at man. But who is it that causes a man to move and to speak?" One collection of the illustrated stories is at the National Museum of China.

Ghosts and hell

Many of the Chinese ghost beliefs have been accepted by neighboring cultures, notably Japan and south-east Asia.
Ghost beliefs are closely associated with the traditional Chinese religion based on ancestor worship, many of which were incorporated in Taoism. Later beliefs were influenced by Buddhism, and in turn influenced and created uniquely Chinese Buddhist beliefs.

Zhong Kui is a mythological figure, generally a vanquisher of ghosts and evil beings, and reputedly able to command 80,000 demons. Another mythological figure is Yan luo, the judge of Hell.

Mood setting

Chinese artists focus on the spiritual qualities of the painting and on the ability of the artist to reveal the inner harmony of man and nature, as perceived according to Taoist and Buddhist concepts. Artists, like Su Shi used their skills in calligraphy (the art of beautiful writing) to make ink paintings that expressed ideas based upon the philosophies of Chinese dynasties and Confucius. Their works also express their feelings and the inner spirit of their subject.

Within a night scene, homesickness is expressed by flying birds looking to find a place to rest for the night

Han Gan, Night-Shining White Horse
Han Gan created Night-Shining White Horse to dramatically capture the spirit of the imperial stallion, a symbol of China's powerfulness using only ink and paper. The stark image, without color or shading, exposes the true essence of the scene.

Ma Lin, Waiting for Guests by Lamplight
Waiting for Guests by Lamplight was painted in the Song Dynasty by Ma Lin, son of famous Chinese painter Ma Yuan. Using shi i (English: poetic ideas), Ma Lin painted the evening scene based upon a poem by Su Shi. In it, a man sits in the door of a pavilion during a full moon. A gentle mood is set by soft, low-lying fog before the mountains and crabapple trees. Leading up to the building is a line of candles specially placed near the blossoming crab apple trees - to "illuminate their beauty".

The poem by 11th century poet Su Shi that inspired Ma Lin is:

My fear is that in the depth of night,
The flowers will fall asleep and depart.
So I light the tall candles,
To illuminate their beauty.

Moon

In Chinese night paintings, the moon often symbolizes loneliness of the painting's character. It also sets the mood for a romantic setting. Chinese paintings also depict mythological characters who symbolize moonlight activity, such as Yue-Laou, the "old man of the moonlight" and Chang'e, the Chinese goddess of the moon.

Chang'e, goddess of the moon

The Goddess Chang'e in the Lunar Palace depicts Chang'e, the Chinese goddess of the moon from Chinese mythology. The late Ming dynasty fan painting shows her outside the Palace of Boundless Cold. Chang'e Flying to the Moon is a contemporary depiction of the goddess.

Political statement

Night Revels of Han Xizai was painted by Gu Hongzhong during the Five Dynasties and Ten Kingdoms period when dynasties replaced one another at an alarming rate. Fives vignettes are told about a party that Han Xizai, a minister of Li Yu, hosts. In the first scene (viewed from right to left), Han listens to the pipa with his guests. Then, he watches dancers, takes a rest, plays string instruments, and finally sees guests off.  It is believed that this painting was made in response to a request by emperor Li Yu to Gu, following Han's declination of an offer to be Prime Minister. One interpretation is that the painting was a way of chastising Han for having a carefree nightlife rather than accepting greater political responsibility.

Japan
While paintings are generally a snapshot of a moment in time, the Japanese iji dôzu (English: "different time, same illustration") technique is used to is illustrate activities that occur in different periods of time. A Long Tale for an Autumn Night uses that technique through a progression of time and activities over one night. During the Autumn night a Buddhist monk and his lover experience a fearful night of a demon in initially disguised as a man, a battle, and threat of suicide - all the more sinister by the gloom of night.

Battle

Folklore and literature

Ghosts and witches

Demons and hell

One Hundred Aspects of the Moon
In the 19th century Tsukioka Yoshitoshi made a series of 100 ukiyo-e, Japanese wood block prints, called One Hundred Aspects of the Moon that introduced Japanese and Chinese folklore during a period of increasing western presence. The works captured "a moment in time and held suspended by a poetic dialogue with the moon." The moon symbolized different meanings depending upon whether it was a full moon or not. The moon's "waxing and waning", also used as the basis of the Japanese lunar calendar, could illustrate what time of the month an event occurred and an ascribe a manner in was to be interpreted, such as the character's loneliness.

In Gravemarker Moon, the famous poet Ono no Komachi meditates on the arrogance and heartlessness she displayed to her suitors as a young beauty.

Wang Changling is the name of the poet who wrote: "The night is still and a hundred flowers are fragrant in the western palace. She orders the screen to be rolled up, regretting the passing of spring with the Yunhe across her lap. She gazes at the moon, the colors of the trees are hazy in the indistinct moonlight."

Tale of Genji

Tale of Genji also included Tale of Genji's love, which has an illustration.

Landscapes

According to the Metropolitan Museum of Art, Night Rains, of the 8 Famous Views of the Xiao and Xiang Rivers, is "a venerable theme in both Chinese and Japanese painting".

Fireworks at Ryōgoku captures the popular summer entertainment called "taking in the cool of the evening."

Mood setting

Moon

Suzuki Harunobu made many night paintings, including Two Girls on the Veranda Looking at the Moon. Many of the settings were warm relational studies, such as Night Rain at the Double-Shelf Stand which includes a parlor scene with two young women and a boy. A soft mood is set with the presence of a tea set and portable hearth for boiling water. The Metropolitan Museum of Art states that this painting is a nod to Night Rains of 8 Views of the Xiao and Xiang Rivers, a painting well respected by both the Japanese and Chinese.

Korea

Buddhism was an important part of Korean art since about the time of the Unified Silla period when there was a desire to be open to other religions. This resulted in the use of Buddhist themes in art work and the creation of Buddhist temples. In the 14th century, a work was made of Water-Moon Avalokiteshvara, a compassionate and wise bodhisattva who wears a halo as a sign of his divinity and has waves of water splashing his feet. A legendary hare stands under a cassia tree in the moon creating the elixir of immortality.

South Asian art

India

For traditional art, there is little difference between the way night and day are illustrated and the colors that are used. For instance in early Rajput (also called Rajasthani) paintings, the only way to read that the painting is a night scene is through the presence of torches or candles. Later in the Rajput period, both somewhat influenced by Western art, night scenes were painted dramatically with shadows and Mughal paintings used chiaroscuro for shading.
 
Although there are a number of schools that taught painting during India's history, there is great similarity among them to evoke charming, romantic scenes. The scenes may include moonlight or lanterns to set an amorous mood. Such was the case for 19th century artist, Chokha, who enjoyed making night paintings like Escapade at Night: A Nobleman Climbs a Rope to Visit his Lover. In that painting Chokha captures the tension of lover climbing several stories into a house with many people and a sleeping guard. Chokha also liked to capture twilight hunting scenes. He astutely conveyed the effects of lighting variation between twilight and the darkest night.

Rao Bhoj Singh Stalking a Tiger at Night is a painting attributed to the Hada Master of the Kota school. In this case the dark is used for dramatic impact. It provides a dark backdrop to the bright figures of the treed hunting party, riled tiger and battered cow that was used as a lure.

Romantic scenes

Baz Bahadur and Rupmati (not shown) depicts mistress Rupmati and Muslim ruler Baz Bahadur. The scene is illuminated from the moon on the horizon.

Southeast Asian art

Cambodia

Cambodian paintings often took the form of murals, and have religious significance. Before 1200, art in the temples mostly portrayed scenes from the Hindu pantheon; after 1200, Buddhist scenes began to appear as standard motifs. Its art was heavily influenced by the artistry of India.

Laos

Thailand

West Asian art

Persia

By religion

Buddhism

Brahma with Attendants and Musicians depicts a Brahma (Korean: Beomcheon) heaven scene which was painted during the early Joseon dynasty in Korea. Brahma, a Hindu deity, also became part of the Buddhist religion and protected the Buddhist teaching. The heavenly scene is includes musicians with flutes, violins, lutes and other instruments. Smith, author of Arts in Korea, writes: "His abode, the Brahma heaven, was construed as a place of pleasure, populated with heroes, entertainers and musicians." The work, replete with evidence of grandeur, includes two figures who represent the moon and sun.

Utagawa Kuniyoshi made Okabe about 1844 which depicts the death of Buddha. In recounting the death of Buddha, cats are supposed to be the only animals that not to weep. In Kuniyoshi's time, it was believed that when a girl visited a temple after dark, she took the risk of being greeted by an old woman who would offer her to stay the night. Once inside the house, the old woman would become a witch and devour her. Therefore, a cat around temples could be the witch in a cat form.

Islamic

Muhammad's night ride

Other Islamic scenes

Jainism

The painting Vigil on the Sixth Night after Mahavira's Birth depicts four women celebrating the birth of Mahavira's (599-527 BC) birth.

Gallery

See also
 History of Asian art
 History of painting
 Night photography

Notes

References

Further reading
 Bonnefoy, Yves (compiled) and Wendy Doniger (translator). (1993). Asian Mythologies. University of Chicago Press. .
 Ebrey, Patricia Buckley (1999). The Cambridge Illustrated History of China. Cambridge: Cambridge University Press.  (paperback).
 Museum of Fine Arts, Boston; Hokusai Katsushika; Kojiro Tomita. (1957). Day and night in the four seasons. Volume 14 of Picture book series. Museum of Fine Arts.

External links

Painting
Night in culture
Asian art
Moon in art